Vicente Emilio Sojo (December 8, 1887 – August 11, 1974) was a Venezuelan musicologist, educator and composer, born in Guatire, Miranda.

Biography 
Vicente Emilio Sojo was born to a musical family.  Most notable was the fact that both his great-grandfathers were Chapel Masters. In 1896 he began musical studies under professor Régulo Rico. In 1906 he moved to Caracas, where in 1910 he entered the School of Music and Declamation, while simultaneously continuing his self-taught studies in Humanities; in this period he began composing his first musical works. In 1921 he was appointed Music Professor in the School of Music and Declamation. He kept on composing works of diverse sorts for different instrumental and vocal combinations. In 1928, in the occasion of the foundation of the Orfeón Lamas, he wrote his first polyphonic opus.

In 1930 he already was Conductor of the Orfeón Lamas and had founded the Venezuela Symphony Orchestra, of which he was not only conductor-founder, but a resolute and constant driving force. In 1940, together with other composers he prepared the first song book for Venezuelan children.  In 1944, the first promotion of composers graduated under Sojo in the José Ángel Lamas school of music.

Maestro Sojo also involved himself in domestic politics: he was one of the founders of the Accion Democratica Party (AD) in 1941. In 1958 was elected senator of the Republic by the Miranda state and was re-elected in 1963.

Vicente Emilio Sojo can be regarded as one of the main creators of the modern school of Venezuelan music. For the Orfeón Lamas, he compiled and he harmonized more than 200 songs of popular and national folklore, achieving a significant rescue of the Venezuelan musical tradition of the last centuries. Among his most important works are: Chromatic Mass (1922–1933) and Hodie Super Nos Fulgebit Lux (1935). In 1951 was granted the National Music award as recognition for his work.

Sojo's pupils include Alba Quintanilla.

Works 

 1911 Himno a Bolívar
 1912 Romanza sin palabras
 1913 Cuarteto en Re, for strings
 1914 Partitura para festiva
 1914 Tres motetes para la iglesia Santa Capilla
 1915 Misa Coral
 1918 Salve Reina
 1920 Obertura Treno
 1922 Ave María
 1923 Misa Cromática
 1924 Ocho responsorias y un Te Deum
 1925 Palabras de Cristo en el Calvario
 1926–1927 27 canciones de ayer
 1928 Por la Cabra Rubia
 1929 Requiem Inmemorian Patris Patriae
 1930–1933 Misa Breve
 1935 Misa a capella en honor a Santa Efigenia y a su fallecida esposa,La Noche, La Carretera, Rondel Matinal and Hondie nos Fulgebit Lux
 1939 Tres canciones infantiles
 1952 Tres piezas para guitarras
 1953 Misa para Santa Cecilia
 1958 10 canciones infantiles venezolanas
 1964–1969 9 Canciones infantiles

Bibliography 
Oscar Mago: Sojo, un hombre y una misión histórica Type: Spanish : Book Publisher: Caracas : Ediciones de la Orquesta Sinfónica de Venezuela, 1975. OCLC: 13353468

See also 
Music of Venezuela

References

1887 births
1974 deaths
People from Guatire
Venezuelan classical musicians
Venezuelan composers
Male composers
20th-century male musicians